Alexis Argüello (April 19, 1952 – July 1, 2009) was a Nicaraguan professional boxer who competed from 1968 to 1995, and later became a politician. He was a three-weight world champion, having held the WBA featherweight title from 1974 to 1976; the WBC super featherweight title from 1978 to 1980; and the WBC lightweight title from 1981 to 1982. Additionally, he held the Ring magazine and lineal featherweight titles from 1975 to 1977; the Ring lightweight title from 1981 to 1982; and the lineal lightweight title in 1982. In his later career he challenged twice for light welterweight world titles, both times in famous fights against Aaron Pryor.

Argüello has regularly been cited as one of the greatest boxers of his era, having never lost any of his world titles in the ring, instead relinquishing them each time in pursuit of titles in higher weight classes. After his retirement from boxing, he became active in Nicaraguan politics and in November 2008 was elected mayor of his native Managua, the nation's capital city.

The Ring magazine has ranked Argüello as 20th on their list of "100 greatest punchers of all time", while the Associated Press ranked him as the world's best Junior Lightweight of the 20th century. He was named one of the 20 greatest fighters of the past 80 years by The Ring magazine and is widely regarded as one of the greatest boxers to ever come out of Latin America and one of the few to have fought in four different decades.

Early life and amateur career 
Argüello was born April 19, 1952. His father was a shoemaker. Argüello had a troubled childhood, growing up in abject poverty in Managua. When he was 5 years old, his father attempted suicide. At the age of 9, Argüello ran away to work in a dairy farm. When he was 13, he emigrated to Canada to provide for his family. Argüello was constantly involved in street brawls through his teenage years, but it wasn't until his sister Marina, one of Alexis' 7 siblings, married a boxer that young Alexis took an interest in the sport. Argüello's brief amateur career saw him compile a 58–2 record.

Boxing career

Featherweight 
Argüello debuted on October 26, 1968, trained by former boxer Miguel Angel Rivas. After winning his first 3 fights "The Explosive Thin Man" suffered an unavenged fourth-round KO loss, followed by another split decision loss. Argüello would then win 29 of his next 30 bouts over the next 5 years, including a win over José Legrá. Eventually, Argüello earned a world featherweight championship bout against experienced WBA champion Ernesto Marcel. The fight took place in Panama, Marcel's home country. The young challenger lost a 15-round unanimous decision in the champion's retirement bout. Months after Marcel's retirement, the WBA featherweight title was won by former unified bantamweight champion Rubén Olivares.

Undaunted, Argüello put together another streak of wins, and found himself contending for the WBA featherweight, this time against Olivares in the latter's first defense. The fight took place at The Forum in Inglewood on November 23, 1974. After Olivares had built a small lead on the judges' scorecards, Argüello and Olivares landed simultaneous left hooks in round thirteen. Olivares's left hand caused a visible expression of pain on Argüello's face, but Argüello's left hand caused Olivares to crash hard against the canvas. A few seconds later, Argüello was the new featherweight champion of the world.

Argüello's first defense came against Venezuelan featherweight champion Leonel Hernández. Once again, Argüello fought in enemy territory, as the fight took place in Caracas. Nevertheless, Argüello made short work of his challenger, stopping him by technical knockout in the 8th round. His first defense in Nicaragua was against Rigoberto Riasco. Argüello dominated once again, this time stopping Riasco in the second round. Next up for Argüello would be Royal Kobayashi, a highly touted Japanese challenger who was undefeated until then. After a tense, close start Argüello's relentless body-punching broke Kobayashi halfway through the fifth round, with the challenger dropping to the canvas twice.

Junior lightweight 

After a successful fourth defense, Argüello moved up in weight to challenge world junior lightweight champion Alfredo Escalera in Bayamón, Puerto Rico, in what has been nicknamed The Bloody Battle of Bayamon by many. Escalera had been a busy champion with ten defenses, and he had dethroned Kuniaki Shibata in 2 rounds in Tokyo. In what some experts (including The Ring writers) consider one of the most brutal fights in history, Escalera had his eye, mouth and nose broken early, but was rallying back in the scorecards when Argüello finished him, once again in the thirteenth round.

His reign at Junior Lightweight saw him fend off the challenges of Escalera in a rematch held at Rimini, Italy, as well as former and future world champion Bobby Chacon, future two time world champion Rafael "Bazooka" Limón, Ruben Castillo, future champion Rolando Navarrete, and Diego Alcalá, beaten in only one round.

Argüello suffered many cuts around his face during his second victory against Escalera. The on-site doctor wanted him hospitalized, but Argüello had a flight to catch from Rome the next day to return to Nicaragua, and he boarded a train from Rimini. The doctor decided to travel with Argüello, and performed plastic surgery on Argüello's cuts with Argüello awake.

Lightweight 
After eight successful title defenses, Argüello then moved up in weight again, and this time he had to go to London, England, to challenge world lightweight champion Jim Watt. Watt lasted fifteen rounds, but the judges gave Argüello a unanimous 15-round decision, thus making him only the sixth boxer to win world titles in 3 divisions, and the second Latin American (after Wilfred Benítez had become the first by beating Maurice Hope one month before) to do it. He had to face some less known challengers in this division, one exception being the famous prospect Ray Mancini (known as "Boom Boom" Mancini). Mancini and Argüello engaged in a fight that was later showcased in a boxing video of the best fights of the 1980s, with Argüello prevailing by stoppage when he decked Mancini in round 14. After the fight, Argüello gained many American fans when he embraced Mancini and told a CBS Television audience that he would do anything to help Mancini's father, who at the time was dealing with illness. Andrew Ganigan proved to be one of Argüello's toughest challenges as he dropped Argüello in the second round, but ultimately the defending champion prevailed by stopping Ganigan in the fifth.

Junior welterweight

Battles with Aaron Pryor 

Arguello successfully defended his lightweight title four times. After defeating James 'Bubba' Busceme by sixth round stoppage, Argüello decided to move up in weight class again, and on November 12, 1982, he tried to become the first world champion in 4 different categories, meeting the heavier and future Hall-of-Famer Aaron Pryor, in what was billed as The Battle of the Champions in Miami, Florida. Argüello was stopped in the 14th round. The fight sparked controversy however, because Pryor's trainer, Panama Lewis, introduced a second water bottle which he described as "the bottle I mixed" after round 13, leading to speculation that the bottle was tainted. The Florida State Boxing Commission failed to administer a post-fight urinalysis, adding to speculation that the bottle contained an unsanctioned substance. Lewis claimed at various times that the bottle was filled with peppermint schnapps or Perrier to help Pryor deal with an upset stomach. It was later revealed in an interview with former Lewis-trained boxer Luis Resto that Lewis would break apart antihistamine pills used to treat asthma and pour the medicine into the water, giving Lewis's fighter greater lung capacity in the later rounds of a fight. 
Others say that there was a mixture of cocaine, honey and orange juice in the bottle.

A rematch was ordered. This time, in Las Vegas, Arguello was KO-ed in the tenth, and stated after the fight "I'm not going to fight anymore. I quit." But he later returned to the ring for financial reasons.

Comeback and post-retirement
During the 1980s Argüello briefly fought with the Contras in his native Nicaragua, but after a few months in the jungle he retired from the war. He then attempted several comebacks into boxing during the late 1980s and early 1990s and had some success, most notably a fourth round stoppage of former World Junior Welterweight Champion Billy Costello in a 1986 televised bout that put him in a position for another shot at the Junior Welterweight title. He retired for good in 1995 with a record of 82 wins, 8 losses, and 65 KO's, along with the recognition of being one of the sports most universally respected fighters among fans, experts, and boxers.

Argüello was elected to the International Boxing Hall Of Fame in 1992. In 2008 he was honored by being selected as Nicaragua's flag-bearer at the Opening Ceremony of the Beijing Olympics.

Argüello was an avid breeder of cats, and had several articles published in Cat Fancy magazine throughout the 1990s.

He remained very friendly with his old rivals Alfredo Escalera and Aaron Pryor, and both pairs of friends saw each other several times until Argüello's death.

Alexis Arguello was voted as the Greatest Junior Lightweight Ever by the Houston Boxing Hall Of Fame in 2014. The HBHOF is a voting body composed entirely of current and former fighters.

Political career
Argüello was actively involved in Nicaraguan politics with the Sandinista National Liberation Front (FSLN)--the same party against whom he took up arms in the 1980s—and in 2004 was elected vice-mayor of Managua. Amid accusations of vote-rigging Argüello narrowly won the mayoral election in Managua on November 9, 2008 against the candidate of the Constitutionalist Liberal Party, Eduardo Montealegre, who had come second to Daniel Ortega in the 2006 presidential election. Argüello's margin of victory was narrow as he attained just 51.30% of the vote.

Death

Argüello died on July 1, 2009, after apparently shooting himself through the heart in Managua. The national police confirmed the death shortly afterwards, and the death was ruled a suicide following the autopsy.

Those close to Argüello affirmed that he was becoming progressively disenchanted with the Orteguistas and the Sandinista government, and was planning an imminent departure from the Sandinista political party.

Professional boxing record

See also
List of WBA world champions
List of WBC world champions
List of lightweight boxing champions
List of boxing triple champions

References

External links

BoxingInsider.com Biofile interview with Alexis Arguello
Aladdin Freeman's BraggingRights Interview With Arguello 2004 
On June 26, 2009, in Carolina, Puerto Rico, Argúello placed flowers at a monument for Roberto Clemente to honor the late baseball great. 

1952 births
2009 suicides
Nicaraguan sportsperson-politicians
World featherweight boxing champions
International Boxing Hall of Fame inductees
World super-featherweight boxing champions
World lightweight boxing champions
Mayors of Managua
Nicaraguan male boxers
Politicians who committed suicide
Suicides by firearm in Nicaragua
World Boxing Association champions
World Boxing Council champions
Sportspeople from Managua
Light-welterweight boxers
The Ring (magazine) champions
Bantamweight boxers
2009 deaths